Hey America is the 30th studio album by American musician James Brown. The album was released in 1970, by King Records.

Track listing

References

1970 albums
1970 Christmas albums
James Brown albums
Albums produced by James Brown
King Records (United States) albums